D'Anthony Smith (born June 9, 1988) is a former American football nose tackle and Super Bowl 48 Champion with the Seattle Seahawks. He was drafted by the Jacksonville Jaguars in the third round of the 2010 NFL Draft. He played college football at Louisiana Tech University after receiving a Division-1 Athletic Scholarship.

Early years
Smith was born in Berlin, Germany, but eventually moved to Fort Polk, Louisiana. At Pickering High School, Smith competed in three sports, football, basketball and shot put. He started all four years at the school, and every year but one, he received an award for his play on the defensive line. As a senior, he had 80 tackles and three sacks.

College career
In his collegiate debut as a true freshman in 2006, Smith intercepted a pass that was deflected by another player against Nebraska. Smith overall, started eight games and came off the bench in five for the Bulldogs and had 38 tackles. His career high in tackles came against North Texas when he had seven, he also had five against Fresno State.

Against Fresno State as a sophomore in 2007, Smith equaled his total from the season before with five tackles, but also added a sack on their quarterback Tom Brandstater. For the season, he started 11 games and missed one due to injury and had 42 tackles and three sacks. Smith tied his career high in tackles with seven against Central Arkansas.

Against San Jose State in 2008, Smith had seven tackles and one sack. Heading into the Independence Bowl against Northern Illinois, he led the team with five sacks and was third with 65 tackles. He was named as a member of the First-team All-WAC following the regular season. For the season, he had nine tackles on two occasions and was named All-Louisiana. He started every one of the Bulldogs's 13 games.

In 2009, Smith was listed at No. 11 on Rivals.com′s preseason defensive tackle power ranking. He was also named to the 2009 Outland Trophy watch list.

Professional career

Jacksonville Jaguars
Smith was drafted by the Jacksonville Jaguars in the third round (74th overall) of the 2010 NFL Draft. He spent his first two NFL seasons on injured reserve.

He registered his first career tackle in the Jaguars' 2012 season opener against the Minnesota Vikings. He was placed on injured reserve on November 28, 2012.

Seattle Seahawks
The Jaguars announced that Smith was one of their final preseason cuts on August 30, 2013. However, before the team had officially submitted their cuts, Smith was traded to the Seattle Seahawks on August 31 for a conditional draft pick. He was released by the Seahawks on September 24, 2013.

Detroit Lions
The Lions claimed Smith off waivers on September 25, 2013, and released him on October 2.

Seattle Seahawks (second stint)
Smith was re-signed by the Seattle Seahawks to their practice squad on October 5, 2013. Smith re-signed with Seattle on March 19, 2015. On August 31, 2015, Smith was cut by the Seahawks during the preseason.

Chicago Bears
On October 13, 2015, the Chicago Bears signed Smith to their practice squad. He was promoted to the active roster on December 22. On May 2, 2016, the Bears released Smith.

Retirement
After retiring from the NFL, Dr. D'Anthony Smith earned credentials as an Associate Certified Coach (ACC) and Certified Mental Performance Consultant (CMPC). He completed a Doctorate of Education in Clinical Mental Health Counseling with Specialization in Sport & Performance Psychology (2020). Dr. D'Anthony Smith completed his dissertation entitled: The Autonomous Response & Its Impact on Performance Expectancy In Athletes, at the University of Western States, Portland, Oregon. He is a member of the National Football Association, the Association for Applied Sport Psychology, the National Strength and Conditioning Society, the International Coach Federation, and the American Counseling Association. As a self-employed founder and Licensed Clinical Sports Counselor, Dr. D'Anthony Smith supports young athletes by providing sports counseling, mental performance training, and sports life coaching at Unleash! Mental Performance.

References

External links

Seattle Seahawks bio
Jacksonville Jaguars bio
Louisiana Tech Bulldogs bio

1988 births
Living people
Sportspeople from Berlin
People from Leesville, Louisiana
Players of American football from Louisiana
American football defensive tackles
Louisiana Tech Bulldogs football players
Jacksonville Jaguars players
Seattle Seahawks players
Detroit Lions players
Chicago Bears players